Since the days of Rudolph of Habsburg and the 1283 Treaty of Rheinfelden, the combination of red-white-red was widely considered to be the Austrian (later also Inner Austrian) colours used by the ruling Habsburg dynasty. Black and yellow later became the colours used by the Imperial House of Habsburg when they held the title of Holy Roman Emperor, as they did from the mid-15th century all the way to the dissolution of the Holy Roman Empire in 1806, and were themselves derived from the banner of the empire. The original form of this flag featured a yellow background with a black double-headed eagle. However, this proved to be a complicated design, and was hard to reproduce. In the 18th century, a simpler form with black and yellow bars started to appear in the lands ruled by the Habsburg monarchy. With the end of the Holy Roman Empire in 1806, this flag was approved for use as a civil flag. The black–yellow flag was used in a way similar to a modern national flag by the Austrian Habsburg monarchy within the Holy Roman Empire, by the later Austrian Empire, and by the Austrian part of Austria-Hungary, and was sometimes informally used for the entire empire, up until 1918.

During the reign of Emperor Joseph II, the Austrian, later Austro-Hungarian Navy started using a naval ensign (Marineflagge) based on the red–white–red colours, and augmented with a shield of similar colours. Both this and the black–yellow flag became obsolete with Austria-Hungary's dissolution in 1918, and the newly-formed rump state of German Austria adopted the red–white–red triband as its national flag.

The flag is similar to the flags of Namur, Belgium, of Munich, Germany, and of the German state of Baden-Württemberg.

See also
List of Austrian flags
Flag of Austria

References

Habsburg monarchy

Habsburg Monarchy